Below is a list of governors of the Brazilian state of Bahia.

(*)Signifiies substitutes that legally occupied the office of governor.

See also
 List of mayors of Salvador, Bahia

Bahia